There are two townlands with the name Newtown, in the Barony of Owney and Arra in County Tipperary, Ireland.	
Newtown in the civil parish of Youghalarra
Newtown in the civil parish of Templeachally
There are nineteen townlands known as Newtown in the whole of County Tipperary.

References

Townlands of County Tipperary